The Regius Professorship of Hebrew in the University of Oxford is a professorship at the University of Oxford, founded by Henry VIII in 1546.

In 1630, through the influence of William Laud, Archbishop of Canterbury, a canonry of Christ Church was perpetually annexed to the professorship.

List of Regius Professors
Incomplete list:

Godfrey Rolles Driver twice served as acting professor during vacancies, in 1934–1935 and 1959–1960. However, he was not eligible to hold the chair outright, as he was a layman and the chair was attached to an Anglican canonry of Christ Church, requiring the holder to be in holy orders. The university statutes were changed in 1960 to allow William McHardy, a Church of Scotland layman, to be appointed.

The term of Jan Joosten was ended on 3 July 2020 in the wake of criminal charges for possessing images of child sexual abuse.

References

Hebrew, Regius
Hebrew, Oxford
Hebrew, Regius, Oxford
Hebrew-speaking people by occupation
1546 establishments in England
Lists of people associated with the University of Oxford